Grant Paul Lindsay (born 25 August 1979) is an Australian cricketer who played for the Victorian Bushrangers side. He is a right arm medium-pace bowler but also a capable lower-order batsman, especially in one day cricket. Seen as more of a one-day specialist, he has played only one first-class game while playing one day cricket regularly since his debut in 2005/06.

External links 
 Cricinfo Profile

1979 births
Australian cricketers
Living people
Victoria cricketers
Cricketers from Melbourne
People from Mount Waverley, Victoria